Microstigma maculatum is a species of narrow-winged damselfly in the family Coenagrionidae. It is found in South America.

References

Further reading

 

Coenagrionidae
Articles created by Qbugbot
Insects described in 1860